Emiliana Kampilan is a Filipino writer and comic book creator best known for the critically acclaimed graphic novel "Dead Balagtas."  The name is a pseudonym, and the artist famously remains anonymous by attending public events with her head covered by a bayong.

Among the most prestigious awards won by Kampilan for Dead Balagtas include Philippines' 37th National Book Awards, given by the National Book Development Board, and the 18th Madrigal-Gonzalez Best First Book Award (MGBFBA), given by the University of the Philippines' Institute of Creative Writing, both in 2018.

See also 
 Gerry Alanguilan

References 

Filipino comics artists
Filipino artists
Filipino speculative fiction writers
Tagalog-language writers
Year of birth missing (living people)
Living people